The Sociedade Portuguesa de Autores (or SPA) translated as Portuguese Society of Authors is a limited liability cooperative, founded in Portugal in 1925 to manage copyrights.

External links
 
 Official Website

References 

1925 establishments in Portugal
Professional associations based in Portugal
Copyright collection societies